The 1st West Essec CC Formula 2 Race was a non-championship Formula Two motor race held at Boreham Circuit on 21 June 1952. The race was won by Reg Parnell in a Cooper T20-Bristol, who also set fastest lap. Kenneth McAlpine was second in a Connaught Type A-Lea Francis and Bill Dobson was third in a Ferrrari 125. Ken Downing in another Connaught Type A started from pole position and finished fourth.

Results

References

West Essex CC Formula 2 Race
West Essex
West Essex